The African Saga is a collection of poems by Ugandan poet Susan Nalugwa Kiguli. Published in 1998, it won the National Book Trust of Uganda Poetry Award (1999), It is a collection of 95 poems in four sections: “Poems of Protest”, “Relational Poems”, “Poems of Nature” and “Existential Poems”.

Awards and recognition
Won the National Book Trust of Uganda Poetry Award, 1999.

References

External links 
Beatrice Lamwaka, "Telling the story of a nation through books", Daily Monitor, 6 October 2012

1998 poetry books
Ugandan poetry books
Kumusha
Poetry collections
African poetry